WSFC may refer to:

 WSFC (AM), a radio station  (1240 AM) licensed to Somerset, Kentucky, United States
 Walsall Swifts F.C., one of two English association football clubs that merged to form Walsall F.C.
 Wantirna South Football Club, an Australian rules football club
 Western Stima F.C., a Kenyan football club
 Westland Sports F.C., an English association football club
 Windows Server Failover Clustering, a group of independent servers that work together to increase the availability of applications and services.
 Witbank Spurs F.C., a South African soccer club
 Woodley Sports F.C., an English association football club
 Worcester Sixth Form College